Cigarettes & Carrot Juice: The Santa Cruz Years is a five-disc compilation album by American alternative rock group Camper Van Beethoven released in 2002 on the label Cooking Vinyl. It includes the band's first three studio albums (Telephone Free Landslide Victory, II & III, Camper Van Beethoven); the rarities compilation Camper Vantiquities; and a new live CD, Greatest Hits Played Faster, mostly recorded in 1990.

External links
 
 

Camper Van Beethoven albums
2002 compilation albums